This is the list of presidents of Rhône-Alpes since 1974. Regional legislatures are directly elected since 1986.

Politics of Rhône-Alpes
Lists of French politicians